This is a list of submerged places in Spain. This list includes settlements which are submerged under the waters of a reservoir. When the water level is low, the structures are visible.

Submerged villages and municipalities 

Villages and municipalities under the waters of a reservoir. Sometimes, a new village or municipality is created with the same name in another location:
 Old village of Benagéber in Embalse de Benagéber, Valencian Community
 Old village of Fayón in Embalse de Ribarroja, Zaragoza
 La Muedra in Embalse de La Cuerda del Pozo, Soria
 Old village of Mansilla de la Sierra in Embalse de Mansilla de la Sierra, La Rioja
 Mediano in Embalse de Mediano, Province of Huesca
 Anciles, Burón (partially), Éscaro, La Puerta, Old village of Riaño and Pedrosa del Rey in Embalse de Riaño, province of León
 Sant Romà de Sau in Embalse de Sau, Catalonia
 Santa María de Poyos in Embalse de Buendía, province of Guadalajara
 Santolea in Embalse de Santolea, province of Teruel
 Old village of Portomarín, in Embalse de Belesar, province of Lugo
 Old village of Castellar de la Frontera, in province of Cadiz
 El Atance in Embalse de El Atance, province of Guadalajara
 Argusino in Embalse de Almendra, province of Zamora.
 Old village of Tiurana in Embalse de Rialb, province of Lleida.
 Old village of Lanuza in Embalse de Lanuza, province of Huesca.
 Talavera la Vieja in Embalse de Valdecañas, province of Cáceres.
 Old village of Canales in Embalse de Canales, province of Granada.
 Peñarrubia in Embalse de Guadalteba, province of Málaga.
 Gascas de Alarcón in the Alarcón Reservoir, province of Cuenca.

Gallery

Submerged landmarks 

Landmarks which are partially or completely under the waters of a reservoir. Some of them may be visible under some circumstances:
 Church of Mediano in Embalse de Mediano, Province of Huesca
 Church of Sant Romà in Pantà de Sau, Province of Barcelona, Catalonia
 Hermitage of El Mibral in Embalse de Guadalcacín, province of Cádiz
 Hermitage of San Antonio in Embalse de Mediano, Province of Huesca
 Hermitage of Virgen de Monclús in Embalse de Mediano, Province of Huesca
 A medieval bridge in Embalse de Mediano, Province of Huesca
 Reales Baños de La Isabela in Embalse de Buendía, Province of Guadalajara

Gallery

Moved landmarks 
Some landmarks have been moved partially or completely to another locations and saved from being submerged:
 The Church of Pedrosa del Rey was moved from Pedrosa del Rey to New Riaño.
 The Church of Nuestra Señora del Rosario was moved from La Puerta to New Riaño.
 The Church of San Nicolás was moved from the old Portomarín to the new one.
 The Church of San Pedro was moved from the old Portomarín to the new one.
 The Church of Nuestra Señora de la Asunción was moved from El Atance to Guadalajara and renamed to Church of San Diego de Alcalá.
 A fountain from El Atance was moved to a park in Sigüenza.
 The facade of the Church of San Pedro was moved from the old village of Tiurana to the new one.

Gallery

See also 
 List of reservoirs and dams in Spain
 List of missing landmarks in Spain

References

External links 

 Pueblos que yacen bajo las aguas 
 Photos of Old Riaño 
 Borrados del mapa 

Reservoirs in Spain
Spain geography-related lists

Submerged